Ronald Vink is the defending champion.

Draw

2013 ABN AMRO World Tennis Tournament